Munia coronavirus HKU13 is a species of coronavirus in the genus Deltacoronavirus.

References

Deltacoronaviruses